Walter Hoffman may refer to:

 Walter Edward Hoffman, U.S. federal judge
 Nino Lo Bello, writer who used the pseudonym Walter Hoffman